Imaclava pembertoni is a species of sea snail, a marine gastropod mollusk in the family Drilliidae.

Description
The length of the shell varies between 25 mm and 42 mm.

Distribution
This species occurs in the Sea of Cortez, Western Mexico

References

 Lowe, Herbert N. "New Marine Mollusca from West Mexico: Together with a List of Shells Collected at Punta Penasco, Sonora, Mexico." San Diego Society of Natural History, 1935.

External links
 Gastropods.com: ''Imaclava pembertoni'

pembertoni
Gastropods described in 1935